Lake Agali is a lake in Estonia.

See also
List of lakes in Estonia

Agali
Kastre Parish
Agali